Elbow Room: Stories is a 1977 short story collection by American author James Alan McPherson. It won the Pulitzer Prize for Fiction in 1978.

Contents
The twelve short stories of Elbow Room appear in the following sequence:

"Why I like Country Music"
"The Story of a Dead Man"
"The Silver Bullet"
"The Faithful"
"Problems of Art"
"The Story of a Scar"
"I am an American"
"Widows and Orphans"
"A Loaf of Bread"
"Just Enough for the City"
"A Sense of Story"
"Elbow Room"

References

External links
 Photos of the first edition of Elbow Room

1977 short story collections
Pulitzer Prize for Fiction-winning works
Little, Brown and Company books
African-American short story collections
English-language books